Markus Dworrak (born 23 January 1978) is a German former professional footballer who played as a midfielder.

Career
Dworrak began his professional career with 1. FC Köln.

References

External links
 
 

1978 births
Living people
Association football midfielders
German footballers
1. FC Köln players
1. FC Köln II players
SpVgg Greuther Fürth players
1. FSV Mainz 05 players
FC Energie Cottbus players
FC Rot-Weiß Erfurt players
Dynamo Dresden players
FC Hennef 05 players
Bundesliga players
2. Bundesliga players